Lucchino is a surname. Notable people with the name include:
David Lucchino (born 1969), American biotechnology executive
Larry Lucchino (born 1945), American lawyer and sports executive

See also
Luchino, given name